Colonel John Hurley, Jacobite soldier and Rapparee, fl. December 1694.

Biography

Colonel Hurley was a son of John Hurley, and a grandson of another John Hurley, a younger son of Sir Thomas Hurley of Knocklong, County Limerick, and Joanna, daughter of John Brown, of Mount Brown, County Limerick. He served in the army of King James II in Ireland, and afterwards became a Rapparee.

Along with fellow raparees Colonel Dermot Leary, Captain Edmond Ryan, Captain Matthew Higgins and John Murphy, he issued a proclamation in December 1694, attacking all those not loyal to James II, offered a reward of two hundred pounds to anyone who brought to them any member of King William's privy council and a further fifty pounds for any chief officers still in arms against king James. He may have later escaped to France and served in Berwick's Regiment. (p. 92)

He was a cousin of Sir John Hurley, also a Jacobite, and Luis Roberto de Lacy (1772–1817), Brigadier General of the Spanish Army who fought for Spain in the Peninsular War.

Family tree

     Teige Ó hUirthile, lord of Knocklong, County Limerick and Chief of the Name 
     |
     |
     |                                 | 
     |                                 |
     Dermod                            Tomás Ó hUirthile, fl. 1585.
    =?                                =?   
     |                                 |
     |                                 |___
     Juliana                           |             |
    =Edmond Óge de Courcy              |             |
     |                                 Randal        Maurice Ó hUirthile of Knocklong, fl. 1601-34.
     |                                              =Racia Thornton (dsp)  =Gráinne Ní hÓgáin
     John, 18th Baron Kingsale                                          |
                                                                            |
                                                                            Sir Thomas O'Hurley
                                                                           =Joanna Brown of Mount Brown, Limerick
                                                                            |
     ___|
     |                            |       |                         |                          |                |
     |                            |       |                         |                          |                | 
     Sir Maurice, died c. 1683.   John    Catherine                 Anne                       Grace            Elinora
    =?                           =?      =Peirce, Lord Dunboyne    =Daniel Ó Maoilriain   =Walter Bourke   =David Barry
     |                            |
     |                            |
     Sir William, fl. 1689.       John
    =Mary Blount                 =?
     |                            | 
     |                            |
   Sir John Hurley, fl. 1714.   Colonel John Hurley, fl. 1694.

See also

 Diarmaid Ó hUrthuile, Archbishop of Cashel, c. 1530 – 21 June 1584.
 Colonel John Hurley, raparee, fl. 1694.

External links
 https://web.archive.org/web/20101121140352/http://dalcassiansept.com/pedigrees/ohurley.htm

References

 Irish Pedigrees, pp. 221–23, John O'Hart, volume 1, 1892; reprinted 1989. 
 Ireland and the Jacobite Cause, 1685-1766:A fatal attachment, p. 204, Éamonn Ó Ciardha, Four Courts Press, 2001, 2004. .

Irish Jacobites
Irish highwaymen
Military personnel from County Limerick
17th-century Irish military personnel